Horo (Hor) is an extinct Bongo–Bagirmi language of Chad. Speakers shifted to Ngam.

References

Languages of Chad
Bongo–Bagirmi languages